Changzhou District is a district of the city of Wuzhou, Guangxi, China.

External links

County-level divisions of Guangxi
Wuzhou